Mahapalwas is a Medium village in Jhunjhunu district in Rajasthan.

Geography 
Mahapalwas is located at 28.334° N 75.883° E.

Demographics 
As of 2001 India census, Mahapalwas had a population of 1,738 constituting 277 households. Males constitute 52% of the population and females 48%. Mahapalwas has an average literacy rate of 62%, higher than the national average of 59.5%: male literacy is 73%, and female literacy is 50%.  In Mahapalwas, 17% of the population is under 6 years of age.

Villages in Jhunjhunu district